Ventriculography may refer to:

Cerebral ventriculography
Cardiac ventriculography